Season five of Mira quién baila premiered on Univision on September 17, 2017, and ended on November 19, 2017. The TV series is the Spanish version of British version Strictly Come Dancing and American version Dancing with the Stars. Ten celebrities are paired with ten professional ballroom dancers. The winner received $50,000 for their charity. Javier Poza and Chiquinquirá Delgado return as the show's hosts.

Celebrities

Scores 

Red numbers indicate the lowest score for each week.
Green numbers indicate the highest score for each week.
 indicates the couple eliminated that week.
 indicates the couple withdrew from the competition.
 indicates the couple that was safe but withdrew from the competition.
 indicates the winning couple.
 indicates the runner-up couple.
 indicates the third-place couple.

Ratings

References

2017 American television seasons